Lok-lok is a dish consisting of various steamboat style foods inclusive of meats and vegetables that are served on a skewer in mobile form. 

It is a street food in Malaysia, in cities such as Penang,  Kuching, among others.

See also
 List of street foods

References

Further reading
 

Chinese cuisine
Street food